Insaf Ka Tarazu is a 1980 Hindi revenge drama film produced and directed by B. R. Chopra. The film stars Zeenat Aman, Raj Babbar, Deepak Parashar, Padmini Kolhapure, Iftekhar, Simi Garewal, Shreeram Lagoo and Dharmendra in a guest appearance. The music of the film was composed by Ravindra Jain. The film was remade later in Telugu as Edi Dharmam Edi Nyayam? (1982), and in Tamil as Neethi Devan Mayakkam, with Madhavi in Zeenat Aman's role. The film became a box office success upon release.

Cast
 Zeenat Aman as Bharti Saxena
 Raj Babbar as Ramesh Gupta
 Deepak Parashar as Ashok Sharma
Padmini Kolhapure as Neeta Saxena
Shreeram Lagoo as Mr Chandra
Iftekhar as Judge
Simi Garewal as Lawyer
Jagdish Raj as Police Officer
Om Shivpuri as Mr Sharma
Dharmendra as Soldier (guest appearance)

Soundtrack
The film features four songs all written by Sahir Ludhiyanvi, by playback singers Asha Bhosle, Mahendra Kapoor and Hemlata.

Awards and nominations

 28th Filmfare Awards:

Won

 Best Supporting Actress – Padmini Kolhapure
 Best Dialogue – Shabd Kumar
Best Editing – S. B. Mane

Nominated

 Best Film – B. R. Chopra
 Best Director – B. R. Chopra
 Best Actress – Zeenat Aman
 Best Actor – Raj Babbar
 Best Supporting Actor – Shriram Lagoo
 Best Story – Shabd Kumar

References

External links 
 

1980 films
1980s Hindi-language films
Films directed by B. R. Chopra
Films about rape in India
Hindi films remade in other languages
Films scored by Ravindra Jain
Indian courtroom films
Indian remakes of American films